Pune Cantonment Assembly constituency is one of the twenty one constituencies of Maharashtra Vidhan Sabha located in the Pune district and one of eight in Pune City.

It is a part of the Pune (Lok Sabha constituency) along with five other assembly constituencies, viz Kasba Peth, Parvati, Shivajinagar (Assembly constituency), Kothurd (Assembly constituency), and Vadgaon Sheri from Pune.
Dilip Kamble is the current MLA of the Pune Cantonment Assembly Constituency. He is from the BJP Party.

Members of Legislative Assembly

Election results

2019 results

2014 results

References

Assembly constituencies of Pune district
Assembly constituencies of Maharashtra